The 2012 Indian Premier League spot-fixing case was a controversy which arose during the 2012 Indian Premier League and led to the banning of five cricketers. It started when a Hindi news channel, India TV, aired a sting operation which accused five players of seeking money in exchange for spot-fixing. Bans were imposed on all five, with a life-ban on Deccan Chargers's TP Sudhindra, a five-year ban on Kings XI Punjab's Shalabh Srivastava, and a one-year ban on Pune Warriors India's Mohnish Mishra and Kings XI Punjab's Amit Yadav. In addition Abhinav Bali, who was not in contact with any team during the 2012 season, was banned for a year. In the sting operation, Bali claimed to have spot-fixed during the 2009 season. According to the sting operation, some of the players revealed that they had received more money from the franchises' owners than agreed on in the players' auction; they said that this money was black money.

Sting operation
The sting operation was performed by reporters of India TV Jamshed Khan and Sushant Pathak posing as representatives of various teams. The operation was started in May 2011 and lasted until April of the following year. According to the operation, Srivastava revealed that the money they received from the franchises was black money. According to India TV, he was ready to spot-fix; however, the conversation is only recorded in an audio tape. Bali, who was not in contact with any franchise, claimed to have been involved in spot-fixing during the 2009 season. TP Sudhindra also bowled a no-ball in a domestic match on the wish of the reporter.

Preliminary inquiry
The BCCI carried out a preliminary inquiry headed by Ravi Sawani, the ICC Anti-Corruption Unit's former chief and the current head of the BCCI Anti-Corruption Unit. IPL chairman Rajiv Shukla announced that the IPL would recommend "strict action against those players who were found guilty" and that "the five players have been suspended from all cricket activities with immediate effect." BCCI president N. Srinivasan added that the organisation has zero tolerance for corruption and would "not tolerate this nonsense".

See also
 Controversies involving the Indian Premier League
 2013 Indian Premier League spot-fixing case

References

2012 in Indian cricket
Indian Premier League
Sports betting scandals
Spot-fixing case